David McPartland (born 11 September 1980) is an Australian former professional road racing cyclist.

Major results

2003
 2nd Under-23 National Road Race Championships
2004
 1st Stage 2 Tour Down Under
2005
 3rd Overall Jayco Bay Classic
1st Stage 3
 9th Giro di Romagna
 10th GP Industria & Commercio di Prato
2006
 6th Overall Tour Down Under
2007
 1st Stage 2 Tour Alsace

References

1980 births
Living people
Australian male cyclists
Sportspeople from Albury
Cyclists from New South Wales
20th-century Australian people
21st-century Australian people